The 1916 Georgia Tech Yellow Jackets football team represented the Georgia Tech Golden Tornado of the Georgia Institute of Technology during the 1916 Southern Intercollegiate Athletic Association football season. Georgia Tech was a member of the Southern Intercollegiate Athletic Association (SIAA). The Tornado was coached by John Heisman in his 13th year as head coach, compiling a record of 8–0–1 (5–0 SIAA) and outscoring opponents 421 to 20.  Georgia Tech played its home games at Grant Field.  One writer claimed the 1916 team "seemed to personify Heisman." This was the first team to vault Georgia Tech to national prominence.

The season featured the 222–0 defeat of Cumberland, the largest margin of victory in football history. Tech scored the second-most points in the nation, behind Georgetown. Everett Strupper was third in the nation in scoring, including 16 touchdowns.

Several players received post-season honors. Pup Phillips was the first Tech center selected All-Southern, and was selected third-team All-America by Walter Camp. Along with Phillips and Strupper, tackle Walker Carpenter, guard Bob Lang, and fullback Tommy Spence were also All-Southern.

Before the season
In 1916 football used a one-platoon system, in which players played both offense and defense. Coach John Heisman's backfield used the pre-snap movement of his "jump shift" offense.

The team's captain was halfback Talley Johnston. Leading the team was Tech's first great quarterback Froggie Morrison, and providing the punch at fullback was Tommy Spence.

Star halfback Ev Strupper was partially deaf; because of his deafness, he called the signals instead of the team's quarterback. When "Strupe" tried out for the team, he noticed that the quarterback shouted the signals every time he was to carry the ball. Realizing that the loud signals would be a tip-off to the opposition, Strupper told Heisman: "Coach, those loud signals are absolutely unnecessary. You see when sickness in my kid days brought on this deafness my folks gave me the best instructors obtainable to teach me lip-reading." Heisman recalled how Strupper overcame his deafness: "He couldn't hear anything but a regular shout. But he could read your lips like a flash. No lad that ever stepped on a football field had keener eyes than Everett had. The enemy found this out the minute he began looking for openings through which to run the ball."

Tech rejoined the Southern Intercollegiate Athletic Association. Joe Guyon, a transfer from Carlisle, had to sit out the 1916 season in accordance with conference transfer rules.

Schedule

Season summary

Mercer
Tech opened the season with a 61–0 defeat of Mercer using conventional football. Strupper had a 92-yard punt return for a touchdown.

Cumberland

The 222–0 defeat of Cumberland was the largest margin of victory in football history. Cumberland, a Presbyterian school in Lebanon, Tennessee, had discontinued its football program before the season but was not allowed to cancel its game against the Engineers. The fact that Cumberland's baseball team had crushed Georgia Tech earlier that year 22–0 (amidst allegations that Cumberland used professionals as ringers) probably accounted for Georgia Tech coach John Heisman's running up the score on the Bulldogs. (Heisman was also the Engineers' baseball coach.) Another possible reason for Heisman's plan to run up the score was the practice among the sportswriters of the time to rank teams based on how many points they scored. Since this statistic did not account for the strength or weakness of a team's opponent, Heisman disagreed with the amount of weight the writers tended to assign to it, and he may have unleashed his players on Cumberland to make his point.

Cumberland received the opening kickoff and failed to make a first down. After a punt, the Engineers scored on their first play. Cumberland then fumbled on their next play from scrimmage, and a Tech player returned the fumble for a touchdown. The Bulldogs fumbled again on their next play, and it took Tech two runs to score its third touchdown. Cumberland lost nine yards on its next possession, then gave up a fourth touchdown on another two-play Tech drive.

With a 42–0 lead midway through the first quarter, Strupper broke clear and could have scored easily, but he intentionally grounded the ball at the one-yard line to allow Georgia Tech tackle J. Cantey Alexander to score the first touchdown of his career. A teammate later recalled the play as follows:Strupper swapped positions with Alexander ... The team didn't want to make it too easy for Cantey, though. The other boys wouldn't  block for him or help in any way. As soon as the ball was snapped, they ran away from the line and out of the play completely. Leaving poor Cantey to go it alone. Finally, on fourth down, a bruised and weary Alexander got the ball across while his teammates howled with laughter.

The Engineers led 63–0 after the first quarter and 126–0 at halftime. Tech added 54 more points in the third quarter and 42 in the final period. Cumberland's only effective defense was an extra point blocked with a sort of human pyramid.

Sportswriter Grantland Rice wrote, "Cumberland's greatest individual play of the game occurred when fullback Allen circled right end for a 6–yard loss." At halftime, Heisman reportedly told his players, "You're doing all right, team, we're ahead. But you just can't tell what those Cumberland players have up their sleeves. They may spring a surprise. Be alert, men! Hit 'em clean, but hit 'em hard!" However, even Heisman relented, and shortened the quarters in the second half to 12 minutes each instead of 15.

The starting lineup was: Preas (left end), Bell (left tackle), West (left guard), Phillips (center), Alexander (right guard), Carpenter (right tackle), Puckett (right end), Guill (quarterback), Strupper (left halfback), Shaver (right halfback), and Spence (fullback).

Davidson

Sources:

Davidson had one touchdown brought back by penalty. Tech scored with a touchdown, and a safety on a punt fumbled in the end zone.

The starting lineup was: Dunwoody (left end), Bell (left tackle), Lang (left guard), Phillips (center), Fincher (right guard), Carpenter (right tackle), Senter (right end), Morrison (quarterback), Strupper (left halfback), Johnston (right halfback), and Spence (fullback).

North Carolina

Sources:

Tech beat North Carolina 10–6 in a hard-fought contest. Bill Folger starred for the Tar Heels. 

After six minutes of play, Everett Strupper caught a punt and ran 55 yards for a touchdown. Five minutes later, Tommy Spence kicked a goal from the 33–yard line. In the fourth quarter, Carolina scored on a forward pass from Folger to Ramsey which set up a touchdown.

Jim Senter broke a bone in his left ankle in the second period, and Spence was threatened with a concussion by game's end.

The starting lineup was: Dunwoody (left end), Mauck (left tackle), Preas (left guard), Phillips (center), Lang (right guard), Carpenter (right tackle), Senter (right end), Morrison (quarterback),  Strupper (left halfback),  Johnston (right halfback), and Spence (fullback).

Washington & Lee

Sources:

"In a game filled with thrills", Washington and Lee tied Georgia Tech 7–7 in the season's lone blemish for Tech. Tech had to play without Senter or Spence. All the scoring was done in the first ten minutes. W&L's Hall of Fame captain Harry Young returned a punt to Tech's 37-yard line. After two runs brought the ball to the 30, Adams worked the ball to the score in three plays. Strupper threw a touchdown to Bell for Tech's score. The Generals threatened to score throughout the second period.

The starting lineup was: Dunwoody (left end), Mauck (left tackle), Alexander (left guard), Phillips (center), Lang (right guard), Carpenter (right tackle), Bell (right end), Morrison (quarterback),  Strupper (left halfback),  Johnston (right halfback), and Glover (fullback).

Tulane 

Sources:

Tech easily beat Tulane 45–0, using its superior weight to advantage. Everett Strupper scored first on a 70-yard touchdown. After the half Tech used its substitutes.

The starting lineup was: Dunwoody (left end), Mauck (left tackle), Alexander (left guard), Fincher (center), Lang (right guard), Carpenter (right tackle), Bell (right end), Morrison (quarterback), Strupper (left halfback), Shaver (right halfback), and Guill (fullback).

Alabama

Sources:

Tech's line held Alabama's Cecil Creen in check throughout as it won 13–0. The Tide gained just 60 yards and two first downs, while Tech gained 20 first downs and 270 yards.

After a competitive three quarters, Alabama's Gage fumbled a pass from center, recovered by Bill Fincher, leading to a Guill score. Later, Glover scored on a short fourth down run.

The starting lineup was: Dunwoody (left end), Alexander (left tackle), Fincher (left guard), Phillips (center), Lang (right guard), Carpenter (right tackle), Bell (right end), Guill (quarterback),  Strupper (left halfback),  Shaver (right halfback), and Spence (fullback).

Georgia

Sources:

Tech easily beat Georgia 21–0 in the season's only road game. After a scoreless first quarter, Johnston ran for 25 yards around right end, and plunges from Spence soon got a touchdown. In the third quarter, Spence scored again. Tech was then aided by a half-the-distance-to-the-goal penalty by Georgia. The drive ended with a 15-yard touchdown run from Strupper. The starting lineup was: Dunwoody (left end), Alexander (left tackle), Lang (left guard), Phillips (center), Fincher (right guard), Carpenter (right tackle), Bell (right end), Morrison (quarterback),  Strupper (left halfback),  Johnston (right halfback), and Spence (fullback).

Auburn

Sources:

Tech overwhelmed rival Auburn 33–7 to clinch a share of the SIAA title. Tech end Dunwoody scored a touchdown when he recovered a fumble and raced 20 yards. Center Pup Phillips also had a score, falling on a punt he blocked. Auburn's star was Moon Ducote.

The starting lineup was: Dunwoody (left end), Alexander (left tackle), Fincher (left guard), Phillips (center), Lang (right guard), Carpenter (right tackle), Bell (right end), Morrison (quarterback),  Strupper (left halfback),  Johnston (right halfback), and Spence (fullback).

Postseason

Tech scored the second-most points in the nation, behind Georgetown. Everett Strupper was third in the nation in scoring, including 16 touchdowns. The team was retroactively selected as the national champion for 1916 by the Billingsley Report.

Awards and honors
Center Pup Phillips was selected for Walter Camp's third-team All-America and was the first Tech center selected All-Southern. Tackle Walker Carpenter, guard Bob Lang, fullback Tommy Spence, and halfback Everett Strupper were selected All-Southern along with Phillips. Spence got Camp's honorable mention.

First World War
Both Morrison and Spence served in the First World War. Spence was a casualty. He is the namesake of Spence Air Base.

Personnel

Depth chart
The following chart provides a visual depiction of Tech's lineup during the 1916 season with games started at the position reflected in parenthesis. The chart mimics the offense after the jump shift has taken place.

Notes

References

Georgia Tech
Georgia Tech Yellow Jackets football seasons
College football undefeated seasons
Georgia Tech Yellow Jackets football